José Manuel Egea is a Spanish karateka, born on 20 February 1964. He won multiple Karate World Championships in Kumite.

References 

1964 births
Living people
Spanish male karateka
City councillors in the Community of Madrid
20th-century Spanish people